Oscar Alexander Santis Cayax (born 25 March 1999) is a Guatemalan professional footballer who plays as a forward for Liga Nacional club Antigua and the Guatemala national team.

Santis debuted internationally on his youth team with the U20 team on 2 November 2018, and scored his first goal for the team against Guyana in the 2018 CONCACAF U-20 Championship in a 4–0 victory.

On 24 February 2021, he made his senior debut in a friendly match against Nicaragua in a 1–0 victory.

On 4 June 2021, at the 2022 World Cup qualifying match against St. Vincent and the Grenadines, Santis scored his first senior goal for Guatemala in a 10–0 victory.

International goals

Honours
Comunicaciones
CONCACAF League: 2021
Liga Nacional de Guatemala: Clausura 2022

Individual
CONCACAF League Best Young Player: 2021

References

External links
 

1999 births
Living people
Guatemalan footballers
Sportspeople from Guatemala City
Association football midfielders
C.D. Suchitepéquez players
Comunicaciones F.C. players
Liga Nacional de Fútbol de Guatemala players
Guatemala international footballers
Guatemala under-20 international footballers
2021 CONCACAF Gold Cup players